Henrik Møller may refer to:
 Henrik Møller (speedway rider)
 Henrik Møller (politician)